The National Cordage Company was formed in New Jersey in 1887, for the importation of hemp and the manufacture and sale of
cordage. It is noteworthy because of its expansion at the beginning of the 1890s and its initial public offering of $5,000,000 of 8% cumulative preferred stock. The
corporation sought to decrease the cost of production and distribution of their products. It issued a prospectus on August 1, 1887 and quickly sought to dominate the market in raw materials.

The sudden insolvency of the business, in 1893, had to do with its inability to acquire enough money to continue, rather than being a result of mismanagement.

The company plays a part in the novel "...And Ladies of the Club", one of whose protagonists runs a rival rope company.

Company history

In 1891 the firm acquired the Boston
Cordage Company by means of preferred stock and time notes.
The corporation also acquired the Sewell-Day Cordage Company and the Day Cordage Company in 1891. The latter was a small business located in Cambridge, Massachusetts.

The immediate cause of the failure of the National Cordage Company was an attempt to acquire a $50,000 loan. G. Weaver Loper and E.F.C. Young, respectively treasurer and president of the First National Bank of New Jersey, were appointed receivers of the National Cordage Company, on the night of May 4, 1893.

References

Manufacturing companies established in 1887
Companies based in New Jersey
1893 disestablishments in New Jersey
Manufacturing companies disestablished in 1893
Ropework
1887 establishments in New Jersey